Pan Am was the largest American international airline, in existence from 1927 to 1991.

Pan Am or PAN AM may also refer to:

Transportation and communications

 Pan American Airways (1996–1998), a second airline founded by new investors
 Pan Am Systems, the holding company that is parent to:
 Pan American Airways (1998–2004), a third airline established under the same brand
 Boston-Maine Airways, sister company to this airline, which operated service under the Pan Am Clipper Connection brand
 Pan Am Railways, formerly known as Guilford Rail System
 Pan Am Southern, a joint venture of Pan Am Railways and Norfolk Southern
 Pan-American Highway, a near-continuous vehicle route stretching from Alaska to Argentina
 PAN AM (cable system), a submarine telecommunications cable system

Entertainment, music, and sports
 Fly Pan Am, a Canadian experimental rock band
 Pan Am (band), a New Zealand rock band
 Pan Am (TV series), an American television drama series centered on the original Pan American World Airways in the 1960s
 Pan American Games, a quadrennial sporting competition amongst the countries of the Western Hemisphere, held between Olympic Games

See also
 Pam Ann
 Panam (disambiguation)
 Panamanian American
 Panem, fictional world for The Hunger Games series